The 2020–21 Bermudian Premier Division is the 58th season of the Bermudian Premier Division, the highest tier of football in Bermuda. The season began on 26 September 2020 and is scheduled to conclude on 11 April 2021. North Village Rams are the current champions from the previous season.

Teams

Team changes

To Premier Division
Promoted from the 2019–20 First Division
 Devonshire Colts
 St. George's Colts

From Premier Division
Relegated to the 2020–21 First Division
 Boulevard Blazers

Though Somerset Eagles finished in 9th place the previous season, the club was reprieved from relegation and the Premier League will be played with 11 teams this season.

Stadia and locations

League table

Results

References

External links
Bermuda Football Association 

2020-21
Bermuda
1